In the Aztec culture, the Nahuatl word  refers to a period of five intercalary days inserted between the 360 days labeled with numbers and day-names in the main part of the Aztec seasonal calendar. Their location was roughly around 5–18 April every Gregorian year.

Etymology
The word  means "they fill up in vain". The interpretation is that the Mexicas considered the days unlucky, and most activities (including even cooking) were avoided as far as possible during the  period; however this is interpretation is contested.

A more recent minority opinion is that people used the 5 day period to reflect over the past year, and that this contemplation often included a period of fasting.

Position in Aztec calendar
Each of the 18 Aztec "months" had 20 days, for a total of 360 days. The  accounted for the remaining 5 whole days in the nearly 365 ¼ day tropical year (365.2422, actual). There were no "leap days" or "leap years" per-se, so over the course of 52 calendar years of 365 days each, the calendar accumulated a deficit of 13 days, which the Julian calendar (for example) accommodates by adding leap days once every four years.

The 13 days were not considered unlucky, but they were not labeled using the numbers and symbol combinations used for the rest of the Aztec calendar.

References

Aztec mythology and religion
Aztec calendars